The Prize for Inheritance (Prix du patrimoine) is one of the prizes awarded by the Angoulême International Comics Festival. This award recognizes a new French-language edition of great comics from the past. It has been awarded each year since 2004, from a list of 6-8 finalists.

2000s
 2004: L'anthologie by Arthur Burdett Frost
 M Le Magicien (Mandrake the Magician) by Massimo Mattioli
 Ayako by Osamu Tezuka
 Clifton by Raymond Macherot
 Lycaons by Alex Barbier
 Coup d'éclat by Yoshihiro Tatsumi
 Social Fiction by Chantal Montellier
 2005: Le Concombre masqué by Mandryka, Dargaud
 Félix by Maurice Tillieux, Niffle
 Barefoot Gen by Keiji Nakazawa, Vertige Graphic
 Les Mythes de Cthulhu by Alberto Breccia, Rackham
 Mystérieuse, matin, midi et soir by Jean-Claude Forest, L’Association
 Ragnar le Viking by Eduardo Teixeira Coelho and Ollivier, Glénat
 Spiderman intégrale 1969 by Stan Lee, John Romita, Sr. and John Buscema, Panini Comics
 2006: Love and Rockets: Locas part 1 by Jaime Hernandez, Le Seuil
 Comment décoder l’etircopyh by Jean-Claude Forest, L’Association
 L’école emportée (The Drifting Classroom) part 6 by Kazuo Umezu, Glénat
 Polly and Her Pals by Cliff Sterrett, L’An 2
 Popeye by Elzie Crisler Segar, Denoël
 Prince Norman part 1 by Osamu Tezuka, Cornélius
 Snoopy et les Peanuts by Charles M. Schulz, Dargaud
 2007: Sergent Laterreur by Gerald Freedman and Touïs, L'Association
 2008: Moomin by Tove Jansson, Le Petit Lézard
 2009: Onward Towards Our Noble Deaths by Shigeru Mizuki, Cornelius

2010s
 2010:  by Carlos Giménez, Audie
 2011: Bab El Mandeb by Attilio Micheluzzi, Mosquito
 2012: La Dynastie Donald Duck by Carl Barks, Glénat
 2013: Krazy Kat vol. 1 by George Herriman, Les Rêveurs
 2014: Cowboy Henk by Herr Seele et Kamagurka, Frémok
 2015: San Mao, le petit vagabond by Zhang Leping, Fei
 2016: Vater und Sohn by E. O. Plauen, Warum
 2017: Le Club des divorcés (離婚倶楽部, Rikon kurabu) by Kazuo Kamimura, Kana
 2018: Je suis Shingo by Kazuo Umezu, Le Lézard noir
 2019: Les Travaux d'Hercule by Gustave Doré

2020s
2020: La Main Verte et autres récits by Nicole Claveloux and Édith Zha
2021: L'Éclaireur by Lynd Ward

References

Angoulême International Comics Festival